Elachista flavescens is a moth of the family Elachistidae. It is found in Russia, Greece and Turkey.

References

flavescens
Moths described in 1978
Moths of Asia
Moths of Europe